Abdülbaki Gölpınarlı (1900—1982) was a Turkish literary historian of Azerbaijani descent, known for his works on Sufism, Divan literature and Iranian literature. He was a translator and educator, "an outstanding interpreter of Sufism, especially the Mawlaviyya and Bektashiyya schools", as well as "one of the greatest scholars of Turkish Sufism".

Early life and education 
Gölpınarlı was born Mustafa İzzet Bâkî in Istanbul on 12 January 1900, and he died in Istanbul 25 August 1982. His father, journalist Ahmed Agah Efendi, was a follower of the Mevlevi Order who worked as an Ottoman civil servant in Rusjuk, Bulgaria, then moved to Istanbul during the Russo-Turkish War of 1877–78. His mother was Aliye Şöhret Hanım. His family was from Gence, Azerbaijan.

After his father's death he worked in bookshop in İstanbul Vezneciler and as a teacher and administrator in Menbâ-i İrfân İptidiari School in Alaca district of Çorum. In 1922 he returned to Istanbul, where he completed his last year in the MFA. He graduated from Istanbul University, Faculty of Literature, Department of Turkish Language and Literature, under the supervision of Köprülüzade Mehmet Fuat Bey. His 1930 thesis was titled Melâmilik and Melâmiler.

Career 
As a teacher of literature, he worked in Istanbul's Haydarpaşa High School, and with high schools in Konya, Kayseri, Balıkesir and Kastamonu. He was a Persian language lecturer at Ankara University, on the faculty of Language, History and Geography. After earning his doctorate, he taught Islamic-Turkish Sufism history and literature at Istanbul University. In his Divan Literature Declaration (1945), he controversially criticised Divan literature using an ideological approach. "According to the book's argument, Divan literature was a bad imitation of Iranian literature; he was not interested in social problems. Later, he approached Divan poetry with a softer attitude and prepared it for publication from the structure like Fuzuli Divanı (1948) and 'Nedim Divanı (1951)." 

In 1945 he was arrested for allegedly violating Article 142 of the Turkish Criminal Code; after serving 10 months in prison, he was acquitted. 

In 1949 he voluntarily retired. He died 25 August 1982.

Selected publications 

 Boratav, PN, & Golpinar, A. (1943). Pir Sultan Abdal. Ankara: AÜ DTCF Turkish Language and Literature Institute Publication.
Gölpinarli, A. (1945). Tabiat ve Divan Edebiyatı. Divan Edebiyatı Beyanındadır, Đstanbul.
Golpinar, A. (1950). The Organization and Sources of Futuvet in Islamic and Turkish Provinces. Istanbul University Faculty of Economics Journal,11,1-4.
Gölpınarlı, A. (1951). Mevlânâ Celaleddin.
Golpinar, A. (1952). The organization and its sources in the Islamic and Turkish provinces . Istanbul University.
Gölpınarlı, A. (1953). After Mevlânâ Mevlevilik.
Gölpınarlı, A. (1953). Kaygusuz Abdal-Hatayi-Kul Himmet.
Gölpınarlı, A. (1953). Nesi-mî-Usulî-Ruhî.
Gölpınarlı, A. (1954-55, 4 books) Divan Poetry.
Gölpınarlı, A. (1955) Qur'an and Translation.

Gölpinarli, A. (1958). The Twelve Imams.
Rumi, MCI (1959). Divân-ı Kebîr (trans. Abdülbaki Gölpınarlı).
Rumi, FI (1958). Vilâyet-nâme Menâkıb-ı Hacı Bektâş-ı Velî, nşr. Abdulbaki Golpinarli, Istanbul.
Gölpinarli, A. (1961). Nasreddin Hodja.
Gölpinarli, A. (1961). Yunus Emre and Sufism (Sufism).
Gölpinarli, A. (1963). Mevlevi Adap and Erkanı.
Gölpinarli, A. (1965). Yunus Emre, Risâlat al-Nushiyye and Divan.
Rumi, MC (1965). Mevlânâ, Mecallis-i Seb'a: Seven Houses (trans. Abdülbaki Gölpınarlı).
Golpinar, A. (1966). Shaykh Theoday Shaykh Bedreddin . Meat.
Gölpinarli, A. (1966). Sheikh Bedreddin, son of the Simavna Kadı.
Gölpinarli, A. (1969). Hz. Muhammad and Islam.
Gölpinarli, A. (1969). 100 Cults and Sects in Turkey in Question.
Gölpinarli, A. (1969). Sufism in 100 questions (Vol. 14). Real Publisher.
 Gölpinarli, A. (Ed.). (1972). Anthology of Turkish Sufi poetry. National publications.
Golpinar, A. (1973). The catalog of Hurûfî texts (No. 6). Turkish Historical Society Printing House.
Gölpinarli, A. (1973). Hayyam and Rubai.
Gölpinarli, A. (1978). Idioms and Proverbs Translating from Sufism to Our Language.
Golpinar, A. (1979). Islamic sects and Shi'ism throughout history (Vol. 6). Der Publishing House.

References

External links 

Abdülbaki Gölpınarlı Articles
Abdülbaki Gölpınarlı Turkology articles
Sound cloud interview (audio, 6:56 minutes)
 (video, 5:09 minutes)

1900 births
1982 deaths
Literary historians
Sufi literature
Sufi poetry
Turkish Shia Muslims